"Weir" is a song by Australian rock band Killing Heidi, released in May 1999 as the first single from their debut studio album, Reflector (2000). The song became a teen anthem in Australia the year of its release, reaching number six on the ARIA Singles Chart, and remains the band's best-known single. In the United States, the song was released to alternative radio on 25 July 2000. The music video was partially filmed in Sydney's Centennial Park.

Track listings
Australian CD single
 "Weir" – 3:43
 "Astral Boy" (acoustic mix) – 3:09

US promo CD
 "Weir" (Jack Joseph Puig radio mix) – 3:33
 "Weir" (Paul Kosky Australian radio mix) – 3:35

Charts

Weekly charts

Year-end charts

Certification

Release history

References

1999 debut singles
1999 songs
Killing Heidi songs
Songs written by Ella Hooper
Songs written by Jesse Hooper
Universal Records singles